Taber Township is an inactive township in St. Clair County, in the U.S. state of Missouri.

Taber Township was erected in 1870, taking its name from the community of Taberville, Missouri.

References

Townships in Missouri
Townships in St. Clair County, Missouri